Dabri is a large village located in Osian Tehsil of Jodhpur district, Rajasthan, India. The village is situated 80 km north east of the town of Jodhpur and 20 km west of the town of Osian.

Etymology
Dabri – long-spun land; field at wide intervals

Geography
Dabri is located in the Thar Desert at an elevation of 260 metres (853 ft) above mean sea level. The village is situated 80 km north east of the town of Jodhpur and 20 km west of the town of Osian.

References

Villages in Jodhpur district